Olga Krasilová (born 18 March 1925) Is a Czech cross-country skier. She competed in the women's 10 kilometres at the 1956 Winter Olympics.

Cross-country skiing results

Olympic Games

World Championships

References

External links
 

1925 births
Possibly living people
Czech female cross-country skiers
Olympic cross-country skiers of Czechoslovakia
Cross-country skiers at the 1956 Winter Olympics
Place of birth missing